Vlado Paradžik (born 21 February 1967) is a Bosnian judoka. He competed in the men's extra-lightweight event at the 1992 Summer Olympics.

References

External links
 

1967 births
Living people
Bosnia and Herzegovina male judoka
Olympic judoka of Bosnia and Herzegovina
Judoka at the 1992 Summer Olympics
Place of birth missing (living people)